SCSI Enclosure Services (SES) devices contains a number of elements, each of which is defined by a one byte SCSI element code.  There are many different element codes defined to cover various devices as shown in the list below.

List of SES element codes

00h - unspecified
01h - device - disk-drive or other SCSI device
02h - power-supply
03h - cooling
04h - temperature-sensor
05h - door lock
06h - audible alarm
07h - enclosure services controller electronics
08h - SCC controller electronics
09h - nonvolatile cache
0Ah - invalid operation reason - used to determine why an ESI device has failed to complete a command
0Bh - UPS
0Ch - display
0Dh - keypad
0Eh - enclosure
0Fh - SCSI port/transceiver
10h - language
11h - communication port
12h - voltage sensor
13h - current sensor
14h - SCSI target port
15h - SCSI initiator port
16h - simple subenclosure
17h - array device
18h - SAS expander
19h - SAS connector
1Ah-7Fh - reserved
80h-FFh - vendor-specific

How SES elements are used

The SCSI initiator communicates with an SES device using two SCSI commands, Send Diagnostic and Receive Diagnostic Results.  
The most common SES elements are power-supply, cooling-fan, temperature-sensor and UPS. The SCSI command protocols assume that there may be more than one of each device type so they must each be given an 8-bit address.  When the SES controller is interrogated for the status of an SES element, the response includes a 4-bit status code. The most common element status codes are: 1h=OK, 2h=critical, 3h=warning, 5h=not installed.

See the SES article for a more detailed description.

Status codes
When a SCSI SES controller is interrogated for the status of a SES element, the response includes a 4-bit SCSI element status code.  The list of valid codes is:

0h - unsupported - status detection is not implemented for this element
1h - OK - element is installed and no error conditions are known
2h - critical - critical condition is detected
3h - noncritical (warning) - noncritical condition is detected
4h - unrecoverable - unrecoverable condition is detected
5h - not installed - this element is not installed in the enclosure
6h - unknown - sensor has failed or element status is not available
7h - not available - element installed, no known errors, but the element has not been set into operation
8h-Fh - reserved

References
 StorageSecrets.org - SCSI Enclosure Services (SES & SES-2) Management
 08-026r0 SES-2 Element control and status nomenclature.fm - T10.org (page 20 and 22)

SCSI